The Oaklawn Handicap is an American Thoroughbred horse race held annually in April at Oaklawn Park Race Track in Hot Springs, Arkansas.

A Grade II event raced on dirt, since 1984 it has been contested over a distance of  miles (9 furlongs). It used to be raced at  miles (8.5 furlongs).

Records
Track  record: (at current distance of   miles)
 1:46 3/5 – Snow Chief (1987) (New race and track record)

Most wins:
 2 – Styrunner (1957, 1959)
 2 – Gay Revoke (1964, 1965)

Most wins by a jockey:
 5 – Pat Day (1982, 1983, 1984, 1985, 2001)

Most wins by a trainer:
 4 – D. Wayne Lukas (1985, 1989, 2005, 2014)

Most wins by an owner:
 4 – Allen E. Paulson (1990, 1995, 1996, 2000)

Winners since 1969

* † In 2009, It's a Bird won the race but was later disqualified after testing positive for trace levels of naproxen, a non-steroidal anti-inflammatory drug.

Earlier winners

1968 – Diplomat Way
1967 – Mike's Red
1966 – Swift Ruler
1965 – Gay Revoke
1964 – Gay Revoke
1963 – Wa-Wa Cy
1962 – Blue Croon
1961 – Santiago
1960 – Little Fitz
1959 – Styrunner
1958 – Manassas
1957 – Styrunner
1956 – Come On Red
1955 – No race
1954 – Andros
1953 – Our Challenge
1952 – Spur On
1951 – Boo Boo Shoo
1950 – Thwarted
1949 – Fancy Flyer
1948 – Dinner Hour
1947 – Sugar Beet
1946 – Lights Abeam
1944 – Challenge Me

References
 Oaklawn Park Race Track.
 Oaklawn Handicap at Pedigree Query

Graded stakes races in the United States
Horse races in Arkansas
Open mile category horse races
Recurring sporting events established in 1946
Oaklawn Park
1946 establishments in Arkansas